Ted Cohen (1939 - March 14, 2014) was an American philosopher and professor of philosophy at University of Chicago.
His interests included philosophy of art, history of the philosophy of art, especially in the 18th-century, and the philosophy of language.

Education and career
Cohen received his Bachelor of Arts (BA)  from the University of Chicago in 1962, a Master of Arts (MA) from Harvard in 1965 and a PhD from Harvard in 1972 (Titled: The grammar of taste). He taught at the University of Chicago from 1967. Cohen worked mainly in the philosophy of art.

Cohen served as president of the American Philosophical Association (2006-2007) and the American Society for Aesthetics (1997-1998).

He was also the moderator of the Latke–Hamantash Debate at the University of Chicago for 25 years until his death.

Selected books
Essays in Kant's Aesthetics, edited with Paul Guyer (University of Chicago Press, 1982)
Jokes: Philosophical Thoughts on Joking Matters (University of Chicago Press, 1999).
Thinking of Others: On the Talent for Metaphor (Princeton University Press, 2008).
Serious Larks: The Philosophy of Ted Cohen, edited and introduced by Daniel Herwitz. (University of Chicago Press, 2018)

References

Philosophers of art
1939 births
2014 deaths
University of Chicago faculty
20th-century American male writers
20th-century American non-fiction writers
20th-century American philosophers
21st-century American non-fiction writers
21st-century American philosophers
 Harvard Graduate School of Arts and Sciences alumni
University of Chicago alumni
American male non-fiction writers
Presidents of the American Philosophical Association
21st-century American male writers